The Taff Vale Railway O4 class was a class of 0-6-2T steam tank locomotives designed by Tom Hurry Riches and introduced to the Taff Vale Railway in 1907.  They were rebuilt with taper boilers and superheaters by the Great Western Railway (GWR) from 1924.

The first loco withdrawn was 402 in April 1948 from Treherbert shed. The last three locos, 290, 317 and 321 were withdrawn together from Cardiff East Dock shed in July 1955. None were preserved.

Builders and numbering
The locomotives were built in several batches by Vulcan Foundry, Manning Wardle and Beyer, Peacock and Company.  Their GWR numbers were in the range 200-420 but they were not consecutive and were intermingled with other classes.

See also
 Welsh 0-6-2T locomotives
 Locomotives of the Great Western Railway

External links
 Rail UK database entry for Taff Vale Railway O4 class

O4
0-6-2T locomotives
Beyer, Peacock locomotives
Manning Wardle locomotives
Vulcan Foundry locomotives
Railway locomotives introduced in 1907
Standard gauge steam locomotives of Great Britain
Scrapped locomotives